Millenáris Sporttelep is a multi-use velodrome in Budapest, Hungary. It is currently used mostly for cycling events but has also been used for football matches. The venue has a capacity of 8,130 spectators and it opened in 1896.

Other events
Budapest Fringe Festival
Africa Days and Vízibility, organised by Foundation for Africa

Image gallery

See also
 List of velodromes

References

Football venues in Hungary
Velodromes in Hungary
Cycle racing in Hungary
Sports venues in Budapest
1896 establishments in Hungary
Sports venues completed in 1896